Wellgate may refer to:

 Wellgate Centre, a shopping centre in Dundee
 Wellgate (former Dundee street), a former street in Dundee, replaced by the shopping centre of the same name